Rhipidarctia crameri is a moth in the family Erebidae. It was described by Sergius G. Kiriakoff in 1961. It is found in the Democratic Republic of the Congo, Kenya, Rwanda and Uganda.

References

Moths described in 1961
Syntomini